Olomouc District(German: Bezirk Olmütz) is a district (okres) within the Olomouc Region of the Czech Republic. Its capital is the city of Olomouc.

List of municipalities
Babice -
Bělkovice-Lašťany -
Bílá Lhota -
Bílsko -
Blatec -
Bohuňovice -
Bouzov -
Bukovany -
Bystročice -
Bystrovany -
Červenka -
Charváty -
Cholina -
Daskabát -
Dlouhá Loučka -
Dolany -
Doloplazy -
Domašov nad Bystřicí -
Domašov u Šternberka -
Drahanovice -
Dub nad Moravou -
Dubčany -
Grygov -
Haňovice -
Hlásnice -
Hlubočky -
Hlušovice -
Hněvotín -
Hnojice -
Horka nad Moravou -
Horní Loděnice -
Hraničné Petrovice -
Huzová -
Jívová -
Komárov -
Kožušany-Tážaly -
Krčmaň -
Křelov-Břuchotín -
Liboš -
Lipina -
Lipinka -
Litovel -
Loučany -
Loučka -
Luběnice -
Luká -
Lutín -
Lužice -
Majetín -
Medlov -
Měrotín -
Mladeč -
Mladějovice -
Moravský Beroun -
Mrsklesy -
Mutkov -
Náklo -
Náměšť na Hané -
Norberčany -
Nová Hradečná -
Olbramice -
Olomouc -
Paseka -
Pňovice -
Přáslavice -
Příkazy -
Řídeč -
Samotišky -
Senice na Hané -
Senička -
Skrbeň -
Slatinice -
Slavětín -
Štěpánov -
Šternberk -
Strukov -
Střeň -
Suchonice -
Svésedlice -
Štarnov -
Šumvald -
Těšetice -
Tovéř -
Troubelice -
Tršice -
Újezd -
Uničov -
Ústín -
Velká Bystřice -
Velký Týnec -
Velký Újezd -
Věrovany -
Vilémov -
Želechovice -
Žerotín

Part of the district area belongs to Libavá Military Training Area.

References

 
Districts of the Czech Republic